Hafisia is a monotypic snout moth genus described by Hans Georg Amsel in 1950. Its single species, Hafisia lundbladi, described by the same author, is known from Iran.

References

Phycitinae
Monotypic moth genera
Moths of Asia
Taxa named by Hans Georg Amsel
Pyralidae genera